Janne Henriksson (born 5 August 1981) is a Finnish football goalkeeper who plays for VPS in the Veikkausliiga. Henrikson has played in FC KooTeePee where he was the first choice to goal for three years

References
Guardian Football
Janne Henriksson – Vaasan Palloseura

1981 births
Living people
Finnish footballers
FC Honka players
Veikkausliiga players
Footballers from Turku
Kotkan Työväen Palloilijat players
Kaarinan Pojat players
TP-47 players
Association football goalkeepers